The West London Wildcats is an Australian rules football and netball club based in London, England. The club fields teams in each of the three men's AFL London divisions – Premiership, Conference and Social and each of the two women's divisions - Premiership and Conference. The men's reserves team is known as the Shepherds Bush Raiders and wear a green and gold guernsey while the Social team is known as the Ealing Emus and wear a black, red and yellow guernsey. The Wildcats are regarded as the most successful Australian rule football club in Europe and outside of Australia tallying 35 premierships in its club's history.

History
The West London Wildcats were formed in 1990 as a foundation club of the British Australian Rules Football League, now known as the AFL London division of AFL Britain.  They have played in a number of BARFL grand finals, finally winning their first premiership in 2000 against arch-rivals, the Wandsworth Demons, the team captained at the time by club stalwart, Chris Schleter.  They have since followed this up with premierships in 2004, 2005 and 2006 all against BARFL heavy-weights the Wimbledon Hawks. 2004 saw fullback Rowan Bilkey captain the club. Chris Schleter again captained the premiers in 2005 while in 2006 Ruckman and Barclay Dixon lead his team to the BARFL premiership. The Wildcats stand as the only team to win the BARFL Premiership on three consecutive occasions. In 2004 the team achieved another first in BARFL history by claiming the BARFL 'Grand Slam', winning the Anzac Cup preseason tournament, the Brit Cup and both the Conference and Premier Division Premierships, a feat they repeated in season 2006.

The Wildcats also field a second team, the Shepherds Bush Raiders, in the AFL London Conference competition,  and a third side, the Ealing Emus in the AFL London Social division. The Shepherds Bush Raiders have won all but 4 of the 22 Conference premierships since the competition's inception in 2001.

The West London Wildcats celebrated 25 years of existence in 2014. Capping off a fine year by winning the premiership in all 3 grades and securing a berth in the inaugural Champions League tournament held In Amsterdam. They went on to win this title in 2015 and have followed up with victories in 2016, 2017 & 2018. The Wildcats also competed in the Champions League in 2019, and were due to compete in the COVID cancelled 2020 edition. For the first time in Wildcats history, both Men's and Women's teams will compete in the 2023 tournament as champions of London.

In season 2017, the Wildcats had their inaugural women's AFL team playing in the AFL London Conference Women's division, winning the premiership against the Wandsworth Demons. Due to an influx of interest from women wanting to play the great game, in 2018, the club expanded its women's team to two teams and now competes in the Premier and Conference division. In 2022, the Wildcats Women won the club's first premiership division premiership, bouncing back from defeat in the 2021 Grand Final.

In addition to Australian Rules Football, the Wildkittens netball sides play in a number of competitions across London.

Former Brisbane Bears player Rudi Frigo, recruited to the club by Justin "Dogga" Shannon, is probably the Wildcats best known player.

Honour Board

Champions League
2018 Grand Final
West London Wildcats 5.4.34 defeated Amsterdam Devils 2.2.14

2017 Grand Final
West London Wildcats 5.7.37 defeated Amsterdam Devils 2.2.14

2016 Grand Final
West London Wildcats 5.13.43 defeated Manchester Mosquitos 2.1.13

2015 Grand Final
West London Wildcats 8.6.54 defeated Rhineland Lions 1.1.7

Finals
2018 Grand Final Premiership Division 
West London Wildcats 9.6.60 defeated by Wandsworth Demons 8.13.61

Goals: TBC

Best: Cam Linford, Hugh Sandilands, David Rattenbury, Simon Thomas, Rhett Kerr, Robbie Gore

2018 Grand Final Conference Division 
Shepherds Bush Raiders 7.9.51 defeated Wandsworth Demons 4.5.29

Goals: TBC

Best: Scott Michell, Matthew Ness, Nathan Costley, Kade Rowbotheram, Tom Donnelly, Josh Morrison, Taylor Mckenzie

AFL London GF Best on Ground Award: Nathan Costley

2017 Grand Final Conference Division 
Shepherds Bush Raiders 7.8.50 defeated Wandsworth Demons 3.5.23

2017 Grand Final Women's conference Division
West London Wildcats 4.8.32 defeated Wandsworth Demons 0.1.1

2016 Grand Final Premiership Division
West London Wildcats 14.10.94 Defeated Wandsworth Demons 7.1.43

2015 Grand Final Premiership Division
West London Wildcats  8.8 (56) Defeated by North London Lions 8.9 (57)

Goals: TBC

Best: TBC

2014 Grand Final Premiership Division
West London Wildcats 14.13 (97) Defeated Wandsworth Demons 8.10 (58)

Goals:  David Abernethy 5, Matt Abraham 2, Todd Pfeiffer 2, Brad Collins, Keith Della-Vedova, James Ford, Clint Johnson, Brad Wedgwood

Best: Brad Wedgwood, David Abernethy, Sam Wood, Billy Oswell, Matt Shannon

AFL London GF Best on Ground Award: Brad Wedgwood

2014 Grand Final Conference Division
Shepherds Bush Raiders 14.9 (93) Defeated Clapham Demons 2.4 (16)

Goals: David Emerson 4, Kevin Upton 3, Evan Scicluna 2, Nathan Costley 2, Tom Gillard, Nick Graham-Bowman, Dave Little

Best: Ben McCrorey, David Emerson, Nathan Costley, Dan Jeffreys, Adrian Brown, Evan Scicluna

AFL London GF Best on Ground Award: Nathan Costley

2014 Grand Social Premiership Division
Ealing Emus 4.7 (31) Defeated South London Demons 4.6 (30)

Goals: Andrew Mann 2, Brad Tinker, Froggy Triplett

Best: Sean Fenney, Scott Fedrici, Brad Tinker, Markus Rees, Sam Furber

2013 Grand Final Premiership Division
West London Wildcats 10.10 (70) Defeated North London Lions 9.6 (60)

2013 Grand Final Conference Division
Shepherds Bush Raiders  9.5 (59) Defeated Regents Park Lions 5.12 (42)

2012 Grand Final Conference Division
Shepherds Bush Raiders 11.11 (77) Defeated Regents Park Lions 12.3 (75)

2011 Grand Final Premiership Division
West London Wildcats 13.1(89) Defeated Wandsworth Demons 8.9 (57)

2011 Grand Final Conference Division
Shepherds Bush Raiders 17.4 (106) Defeated Clapham Demons 9.13 (67)

2010 Grand Final Conference Division
Shepherds Bush Raiders 12.9 (81) def Clapham Demons 7.3 (45)

2010 Grand Social Premiership Division
Ealing Emus 7.1 (43) def South London Demons 2.5 (17)

2009 Grand Final Premiership Division

2009 Grand Final Conference Division

2009 Grand Social Premiership Division

2008 Grand Final Premiership Division
West London Wildcats 13.8 (86) defeated Putney Magpies 4.3 (27)

Best: 
Justin 'Maca' McCallion, Ross 'Rosco' Dillon, Leigh 'Burki' Burke, Warrick 'Bloodnut' Fenner, Damien 'Sticky' Lyon, Eoin O'Connor, Xavier 'XMan' McKinnon, Barry 'Baz' Malone

Goals: Leigh Burke, Eoin O'Connor 3, Justin McCallion 2, Sam Miles 1 (others TBC)

Norm Smith Medal:  Justin 'Maca' McCallion

2008 Grand Final Conference Division
Shepherds Bush Raiders 7.12 (54) defeated Clapham Demons 6.11 (47)

Best: 
Kade 'Giggz' Nichols, Matty Barr, Pete O'Connel, Marcus 'Willo' Wilson, Shane 'Abbo' Albon, Paul 'Chopper' Donahoo

Goals: 
Marcus 'Willo' Wilson 3, Kade Nichols 3, Paul Donahoo 1

2008 Grand Final Social Division
Ealing Emus 18.17 (125) defeated Nottingham Scorpions 1.5 (11)

Best: 
Al Carlson, Lucas 'Doof' Cullen, Darryl 'Daz' Dissisto, Pete Kasby, Matt Neville, Ryan 'Rhino' Lapish, John Houston, Simon 'Simmo' Berry

Goals: 
Al Carlson 4, Wes White 3, Casey Ratcliffe, Ryan 'Rhino' Lapish 2, Darryl 'Daz' Dissisto, Lucas 'Doof' Cullen, Jeremy 'Jez' Lanberg, Paul 'Cutts' Cutler 1  (others TBC)

Norm Smith Medal:  Doof

International Tour Matches
The Wildcats have played a number of pre-season tour matches across Europe.

2022 Dragon Cup Winners - Men's and Women's Divisions
2022 Gallia Cup Runner's Up
2022 Leprechaun Cup Runner's Up
2015 - 2018 AFL Europe Champions League Premiers
2011 West London d Copenhagen Barracudas
2010 West London d Paris Cockerels
5 April 2008 West London 60 d Copenhagen Barracudas 25
April 2007 West London vs Croatia
7 April 2006 West London vs Barcelona Stars
9 April 2005 West London 163 d Stockholm Dynamite 51

Best & Fairest
1997 Matt Lloyd

End of Season Football Trips

Photos

See also

References

External links
West London Wildcats
West London Wildcats Twitter Page
SOS's 3 Quarter Grand Final Speech 2003 NSFW – Warning

Australian rules football teams in London
Netball teams in England
1990 establishments in England
Sports clubs established in 1990
Australian rules football clubs established in 1990
Women's sports teams in London